The following is a list of earthquakes in South Asia.

See also 
List of earthquakes in Afghanistan
List of earthquakes in India
List of earthquakes in Nepal
List of earthquakes in Pakistan

References

South Asia
South Asia
Asia geology-related lists

ru:Список землетрясений в Южной Азии